KPFR (89.5 FM) is a non-commercial educational radio station licensed to serve Pine Grove, Wasco County, Oregon, United States.  The station, which began broadcasting in 2005, is currently owned by Family Stations, Inc. and airs several Christian ministry broadcasts from noted teachers such as RC Sproul, Alistair Begg, Ken Ham, John F. MacArthur, Adriel Sanchez, Dennis Rainey, John Piper, & others as well as traditional and modern hymns & songs by Keith & Kristyn Getty, The Master's Chorale, Fernando Ortega, Chris Rice, Shane & Shane, Sovereign Grace Music, Sara Groves, & multiple other Christian and Gospel music artists.

Programming
KPFR broadcasts a Christian radio format to the greater Portland, Oregon, area from a transmitter on Mount Hood.  A significant portion of the station's programming is provided by Family Radio.

History
This station received its original construction permit from the Federal Communications Commission on June 11, 2002.  The new station was assigned the call letters KPFR by the FCC on June 27, 2002.

On July 18, 2002, the Educational Media Foundation reached an agreement to transfer the construction permit for KPFR to Family Stations, Inc., as part of an elaborate settlement involving station applications in three states.  The deal was approved by the FCC on September 9, 2002, and the transaction was consummated on December 6, 2002.  KPFR received its license to cover from the FCC on June 16, 2005.

References

External links

PFR
Radio stations established in 2005
Wasco County, Oregon
Family Radio stations
2002 establishments in Oregon